John S. Lekson (April 14, 1917 – January 19, 1992) was a United States Army major general.

He was born to Slovenian immigrant parents. He graduated from Western Reserve University and enlisted in the Ohio National Guard in 1940 as a private. He was commissioned through Officer Candidate School and rose to major during World War II. During the war, he served with the 82nd Airborne Division, including the 504th Parachute Infantry, and fought in North Africa, Italy, the Netherlands and Germany, including the Battle of the Bulge. He also served in Austria, Italy and Korea.

In Vietnam, he served as Assistant Commander of the 9th Infantry Division and the 101st Airborne Division in 1967–68, subsequently rising in rank to major general. His final assignment was Director of Operations for the Readiness Command, predecessor of the U.S. Central Command. He retired in 1975.

His medals included the Distinguished Service Medal, the Silver Star, the Legion of Merit and the Bronze Star.

He died in 1992 and was buried at Arlington National Cemetery, in Arlington, Virginia.

References

External links

 

1917 births
1992 deaths
United States Army personnel of World War II
United States Army personnel of the Korean War
United States Army personnel of the Vietnam War
American people of Slovenian descent
Burials at Arlington National Cemetery
Case Western Reserve University alumni
Recipients of the Distinguished Service Medal (US Army)
Recipients of the Silver Star
Recipients of the Legion of Merit
United States Army generals